Emam District is a district (bakhsh) in Saqqez County, Kurdistan Province, Iran. At the 2006 census, its population was 12,946.  The District has one city: Santeh. The District has three rural districts (dehestan): Emam Rural District, Khvor Khvoreh Rural District and Tilakuh Rural District.

References

See also
Statistical Center of Iran

Saqqez County
Districts of Kurdistan Province